The Czechoslovak Academy of Sciences (Czech: Československá akademie věd, Slovak: Česko-slovenská akadémia vied) was established in 1953 to be the scientific center for Czechoslovakia. It was succeeded by the Czech Academy of Sciences (Akademie věd České republiky) and Slovak Academy of Sciences (Slovenská akadémia vied) in 1992.

History
The Royal Czech Society of Sciences, which encompassed both the humanities and the natural sciences, was established in the Czech Crown lands in 1784.

After the Communist regime came to power in Czechoslovakia in 1948, all scientific, non-university institutions and learned societies were dissolved and, in their place, the Czechoslovak Academy of Sciences was founded by Act No. 52/1952. It comprised both a complex of research institutes and a learned society. The Slovak Academy of Sciences, established in 1942 and re-established in 1953, was a formal part of the Czechoslovak Academy of Sciences from 1960 to 1992.

During the 1960s the academy operated a publishing house, the Publishing House of the Czechoslovak Academy of Sciences, some whose books and book series, such as New Horizons, were jointly published with Artia.

In 1992, the Academy of Sciences of the Czech Republic was established by Act No. 283/1992.

Presidents

Zdeněk Nejedlý (1952–1962)
František Šorm (1962–1965; 1965–1969)
Jaroslav Kožešník (1969–1970, 1970–1977, 1977–1980)
Bohumil Kvasil (1981–1985)
Josef Říman (1985–1989)
Otto Wichterle (1990–1992)

Notable members
 Jaroslav Heyrovský, who won the Nobel Prize in Chemistry in 1959
 Otto Wichterle for his invention of soft contact lenses.   Wichterle was also the first president of the academy after the revival of democracy in the Czech Republic.
 astrophysicist Jiří Grygar
 mathematicians Eduard Čech and Otakar Borůvka
 chemist Antonín Holý
 Polish mathematician Czesław Olech
 cannabis researcher and chemist Lumír Ondřej Hanuš
 biomedical scientist Ján Vilček
 statistician Zbyněk Šidák

See also
 Academy of Sciences of the Czech Republic
 Slovak Academy of Sciences

References

External links
 History of the Academy of Sciences of the Czech Republic
 History of the Slovak Academy of Sciences

Organizations based in Czechoslovakia
Scientific societies based in the Czech Republic
Scientific organizations established in 1953
Organizations disestablished in 1992
1953 establishments in Czechoslovakia
1992 disestablishments in Czechoslovakia
Science and technology in Czechoslovakia